Marija Iveković Meštrović (born 13 May 1981) is a Croatian former Paralympic athlete who competed at international track and field competitions. She competed in discus throw, long jump, pentathlon and sprinting events, she was a two-time World champion and a European champion. She lost most of her sight aged thirteen.

References

1981 births
Living people
People from Nova Gradiška
Paralympic athletes of Croatia
Croatian female discus throwers
Croatian female long jumpers
Croatian female shot putters
Croatian female sprinters
Croatian pentathletes
Athletes (track and field) at the 2000 Summer Paralympics
Athletes (track and field) at the 2004 Summer Paralympics
Athletes (track and field) at the 2008 Summer Paralympics
Athletes (track and field) at the 2012 Summer Paralympics
Medalists at the World Para Athletics Championships
World Para Athletics Championships winners
Medalists at the World Para Athletics European Championships
Visually impaired sprinters
Visually impaired long jumpers
Visually impaired discus throwers
Visually impaired shot putters
Paralympic sprinters
Paralympic long jumpers
Paralympic discus throwers
Paralympic shot putters